Xinpu District is a former district of Lianyungang, Jiangsu province, China. It has been merged with Haizhou District.

The population as of (2004) was 322 000.

References

External links

County-level divisions of Jiangsu
Lianyungang